Jason Chorak (born September 23, 1974) is a former All-American American football linebacker.

Collegiate career
In 1996, he won the Washington Huskies' season award for the defensive L. Wait Rising Lineman Of Year, Pacific-10 Conference's Defensive Player of the Year and College Football All-America Team (by The Sporting News and Football News).

In 1996, he led the team with a single season record of 14.5 sacks and finished his career with 25.5 sacks (a career record that would hold up until 2009).

NFL career
He was selected in the 1998 NFL Draft by the St. Louis Rams in the 7th Round (236th overall) with a compensatory pick. In 1998, he played for the Indianapolis Colts, contributing 1 sack and 3 tackles in 8 games.

Post NFL Career
He played for the XFL's Chicago Enforcers.

Chorak is of Croat origin. His parents are Croatian immigrants.

See also
 Washington Huskies football statistical leaders

References

External links 
 Just Sports Stats
NFL.com Jason Chorak
Jason Chorak NFL Football Statistics - Pro-Football-Reference_com
Chicago Enforcers Roster Jason Chorak

All-American college football players
Washington Huskies football players
American people of Croatian descent
Indianapolis Colts players
Chicago Enforcers players
1974 births
Living people
People from Vashon, Washington